St Clement Danes School is a mixed academy school in Chorleywood, Hertfordshire.

Admissions
St Clement Danes is a partially selective school, providing education to students aged 11 (Year 7) through to 18 (Year 13). Most students are admitted based on proximity to the school, with priority given to students with siblings already at the school, or whose parents are staff at the school, but up to 10% of the Year 7 cohort are admitted based on performance in the eleven-plus exam, and a further 10% may be admitted based on performance in a musical aptitude test. Entry to the sixth form in Year 12 is dependent on GCSE exam grades, and admissions are mainly from students already at the school, but there is also an additional intake of external students.

Location
The school occupies a large site to the northwest of Rickmansworth in Chorleywood. It is about a mile (1.6 km) from Chorleywood station, and is served by buses from the station and Watford. It is situated on Chenies Road (A404), which at that point occupies the boundary of Hertfordshire and Buckinghamshire for a half-mile, adjacent to the north side of the school. The school is less than a mile west of junction 18 of the M25.

History
The school was founded in 1862 by the church wardens of St Clement Danes Parish in Aldwych, London and opened in Houghton Street. It was funded from income from the St Clement Danes Holborn Estate, a charity founded in 1551 which owned a piece of land on the north side of Holborn.

Grammar school (Holborn & Hammersmith)
The first  St Clement Danes Holborn Estate Grammar School for Boys  was established in 1862 in Houghton Street Holborn, near to the church.

In 1928, the school transferred to a new site on Du Cane Road in Hammersmith, where it flourished as St. Clement Danes Grammar School until 1975. The school had a well-known choir which featured in a 1975 EMI recording (ASD 3117) of Carl Orff's Carmina Burana, conducted by André Previn with the LSO (and chorus). The site was next to Hammersmith Hospital, and is now occupied by St Clement's House, a block of flats and Wood Lane High School.

On 29 June 1973, 13-year-old Nicholas St Clair from Fulham was killed on the school playing fields when he was struck in the chest by a javelin thrown by a fellow student. A verdict of accidental death was recorded by the coroner following an inquest into the incident.

Comprehensive (Chorleywood)
In 1975, under an agreement between the Governing Board of the School and Hertfordshire County Council, it was re-established in new premises in Chorleywood, as a Voluntary-Aided Mixed Comprehensive School. In April 1994 the school was incorporated as a grant-maintained school. The Du Cane Road buildings were taken over by Burlington Danes Church of England School, sold to Hammersmith Hospital in 2002 and demolished in 2004.

The school receives additional financial support from the St Clement Danes School Charitable Foundation, one of the beneficiaries of the historic St Clement Danes Holborn Estate.

Academy (Chorleywood)
The school converted to academy status in July 2011. In 2016, the school became part of the Danes Educational Trust, a multiple-academy trust, which also includes Croxley Danes School, Chancellor's School, Elstree Screen Arts academy and Onslow St Audrey's School.

Houses 
The house system was introduced in 1907 with four houses: Clare, Temple, Clement and Dane. By 1938 the school had grown and two new houses were added: Burleigh and Lincoln. Essex and Exeter were subsequently introduced in 1952. On the move to Hertfordshire, the school reverted to six houses, with Clare and Essex not being reintroduced until 2005.

Current Houses and Colours

Commemoration
Every year a commemoration service is held in St Clement Danes Church in London to commemorate the beginning of the school. It is a large celebration, in which the orchestra and choir play a big part. Half of the school visit the church in London, whilst the other half attend a service held at the school in Chorleywood. The school's song 'The Anchor Is Our Emblem' is sung at the church.

Notable former pupils
Boys' grammar school in London:

 Sir John Barbirolli, conductor & cellist
 Maj-Gen Eric Barton CB MBE, Colonel Commandant from 1982–7 of the Royal Engineers
 Geoffrey Davies, developed pacemakers with Aubrey Leatham in the 1950s
 Professor Tony Dornhorst CBE, FRCP, physician
 Wally Downes, Wimbledon football player
 Frank Field, politician
 Martin Fitzmaurice, darts master of ceremonies
 Andy Fraser, bass guitarist, songwriter and sometimes studio piano player with Free: famous for "All Right Now" (co-writer).
 John Jackson, Crystal Palace goalkeeper
 Ben Levene, artist
 Hugh Lindsay (born 1938), English amateur footballer who played for Southampton and appeared in the 1960 Summer Olympics
 Glen Matlock, bass guitarist and songwriter with the Sex Pistols
 Mikey Craig, bass player with Culture Club
 Michael Oliver, broadcaster on Radio 3 and on Radio 4's Kaleidoscope
 Dennis Potter, television playwright, director, novelist
 John Slater, actor
 David Stoddart, Baron Stoddart of Swindon, Labour MP from 1970 to 1983 for Swindon
 Michael Ward, economist who developed international economic statistics
 Alan Wilder, former keyboard player for Depeche Mode

Mixed comprehensive in Hertfordshire:
 Katy Brand, comedienne
 Dee Caffari, record-breaking sailor
 Natasha Khan, singer and musician, Bat For Lashes
 Tim Lovejoy, TV presenter
 Rob Kiernan, professional footballer
 Lee Canoville, professional footballer
 Jack Garratt, singer and multi-instrumentalist
Griff, singer
Liam Watson (record producer)

Notable former staff
Mark Warburton, head coach of Queens Park Rangers, coached part time at the school  
 Andrew Davies (screenwriter) taught English 1958–61.
 Bill Ashton (jazz musician and founder of the National Youth Jazz Orchestra) taught French 1971–73.
 Roland Mathias, poet
 Jonathon Porritt (eco-politician) taught English and directed drama 1974–77

References

External links
 School history
 Get Information About Schools (GIAS)

Schools in Three Rivers District
Academies in Hertfordshire
Educational institutions established in 1862
Relocated schools
1862 establishments in England
Secondary schools in Hertfordshire
Rickmansworth